Jason O'Donnell (born October 13, 1971) is an American Democratic Party politician who serves in the New Jersey General Assembly, where he has represented the 31st Legislative District since September 13, 2010. O'Donnell is the Director of Public Safety for the City of Bayonne where he also serves as the municipal Democratic Committee Chairman. O'Donnell is on leave from his full-time position as a captain in the Bayonne Fire Department.

O'Donnell was chosen by the Hudson County Democratic Committee to succeed Anthony Chiappone, who resigned after pleading guilty to the misuse of campaign funds. O'Donnell won a 2010 special election to complete the remainder of Chiappone's term and was subsequently re-elected to two-year terms in 2011 and 2013. In March 2015, O'Donnell announced he would not seek re-election to a third full term in 2015.

In the Assembly, O'Donnell served on the Financial Institutions and Insurance, the Housing and Community Development, and the Labor Assembly committees. In New Jersey, the Democratic nominee for the gubernatorial election typically gets to select the next chair of the State Democratic Committee. In 2013, Democratic nominee Barbara Buono indicated support for O'Donnell to become the next chair, however through backroom discussions, Passaic County Democratic chair John Currie was selected.

On December 19, 2019, O’Donnell, a Democrat, and also a retired Bayonne firefighter receiving $67,976.88 in annual pension, was charged with bribery in a corruption investigation, due to accepting a paper bag filled with $10,000 in cash at his campaign headquarters during his unsuccessful run for mayor of Bayonne.

O'Donnell is married to wife Kerry and has two sons and one daughter. They live in Bayonne. He is a graduate of New Jersey City University majoring in fire safety.

References

External links
New Jersey Legislature financial disclosure forms
2011 2010 2009

Living people
1971 births
Democratic Party members of the New Jersey General Assembly
Politicians from Bayonne, New Jersey
New Jersey City University alumni
21st-century American politicians